The Kent State Golden Flashes football team is a varsity intercollegiate athletic team of Kent State University in Kent, Ohio. The team is a member of the Mid-American Conference East division, and competes in the National Collegiate Athletic Association (NCAA) at the Division I level in the Football Bowl Subdivision (FBS). The Golden Flashes played their first game in 1920 and since 1969 have played their home games at Dix Stadium. Following the 2022 season, Kenni Burns was selected as head coach for the Golden Flashes.

History

Early history (1920–1970)
The first attempt to establish a football team was in 1914, one year after the first classes were held on campus and four years after the school was founded in 1910. The team played two practice games against local high schools, but was discontinued by the athletic board and faculty to focus on basketball season. While there was hope the team would return for the 1915 season, no team was established until 1920. The team played their first game October 30, 1920, against Ashland College, a 6–0 loss under coach Paul Chandler. The first Kent State home football game was held November 6, a 7–0 loss to sister school Bowling Green. The final game of the season was a home game scheduled against St. Ignatius College of Cleveland, but the game was not played and counted as a forfeit win for Kent. The team would not record their first true victory until November 14, 1925, a 7–6 win over West Liberty State College. Outside the forfeited win in 1920, Kent State would fail to score in their first 14 games, posting a record of 0–13–1 before finally putting points on the board in a 7–6 win against West Liberty in 1923. During that streak, Kent State would suffer the worst loss in school history, a 118–0 loss to Baldwin–Wallace College, also in 1923. Following the 7–6 loss to West Liberty, a new shutout streak began which lasted 8 games, in which the Flashes, then known as the "Silver Foxes" went 0–6–2. The streak began with the second most lopsided loss in school history, an 82–0 loss to Slippery Rock. The streak finally ended with a 6–6 tie with the Indiana (PA) Normal School in 1925, the game which preceded Kent State's first true victory. Kent State posted their first winning season in 1928, going 4–2–2.

Kent State joined the Ohio Athletic Conference beginning in the 1931 season, playing in the OAC through the 1950 season except for the 1943–1945 seasons, which were canceled due to American involvement in World War II. Under coach G. Donald Starn, who coached Kent State from 1935–1942, the Flashes would begin to taste success, posting winning seasons in 1938 (6–2), 1940 (8–1), and 1942 (5–3). During their time in the OAC, the Flashes never won a conference title, but did finish second in 1940 with a 4–0 conference record. The team finished third in both 1948 and 1949, going 3–0 and 2–0 respectively in conference play.

In 1946, the program was revived after the conclusion of World War II under head coach Trevor Rees, who would coach the Flashes to their first era of consistent success. During his tenure, which lasted 18 seasons, the Flashes would post winning seasons in all but 5 of them. In 1950, the team opened their first true stadium, Memorial Stadium, by defeating Marietta College 57–0. The next season saw the Golden Flashes join the Mid-American Conference. Rees would guide the team to its first bowl appearance in the 1954 Refrigerator Bowl. Rees coached Kent State from 1946–1963, posting a record of 92–63–5 (.591). Rees retired as Kent State head coach following the 1963 season.

Leo Strang took over for Rees in 1964, and under his tutelage, the Golden Flashes struggled, compiling a 16–21–2 record. Kent State failed to win more than five games under Strang's leadership, and Strang resigned following the 1967 season. Washington University head coach Dave Puddington was hired to replace Strang, and Kent State's struggles continued. The program posted a 9–21 record during Puddington's three seasons, the best of which was a 5–5 campaign in 1969. During the 1969 season, the Flashes also moved into Dix Stadium, which was not fully completed until January 1970. The Puddington tenure was also marked by the Kent State shootings in May 1970, when the Ohio National Guard opened fire on a group of university students, killing four and injuring nine. Puddington was fired after the 1970 season.

Don James era (1971–1974)
In 1971, Don James took over as head coach. Under James, and with notable players such as Pro Football Hall of Fame inductee and former Pittsburgh Steelers middle linebacker Jack Lambert, Alabama Crimson Tide football coach Nick Saban, and former Missouri Tigers football coach Gary Pinkel, Kent State was finally able to celebrate its first—and so far only—Mid-American Conference title in 1972 followed by a trip to the 1972 Tangerine Bowl.

James coached at Kent State four seasons (1971–1974), posting an overall record of 25–19–1 (.567) which included a 9–2 record in 1973. James left after the 1974 season to accept the head coaching job at Washington.

Coaching succession

Following the departure of Don James, Kent State went through a period marked by mostly losing seasons and regular coaching changes, with no coaching tenure lasting more than three seasons until 1997. Dennis Fitzgerald, who was promoted from defensive coordinator to head coach after James' departure, was able to lead the team to an 8–4 record and second-place MAC finish in 1976 and a winning 1977 season, Fitzgerald was able to continue James' success within the Kent State football program, but left the program after the 1977 season.

Ron Blackledge was promoted from offensive coordinator to head coach following Fitzgerald's departure. Kent State's struggles continued, with the Golden Flashes posting records of 4–7, 1–10 and 3–8 for a total mark of 8–25. Blackledge was fired following the 1980 season.

Succeeding Blackledge was Boston College head coach Ed Chlebek. Chelebek has previously turned around the BC football program and was expected to do the same at Kent State. Unfortunately, he couldn't. The Golden Flashes followed a 4–7 campaign in 1981 with a winless 0–11 season in 1982. Chlebek was fired following the 1982 season.

Utah offensive line coach Dick Scesniak was hired as Chlebek's replacement and, once again, Kent State's football struggles persisted. Scesniak's teams posted records of 1–10, 4–7 and 3–8 for a total of 8–25. Scesniak died of a heart attack on April 1, 1986.

Ohio State offensive coordinator Glen Mason was hired as Kent State's head coach in 1986. In his two seasons in Kent posted two consecutive 2nd place MAC finishes including a 7–4 overall mark in 1987, the Flashes' first winning season since 1977. Following the 1987 season, Mason was hired by the Kansas Jayhawks. Kent State alumnus Nick Saban, the defensive coordinator at Michigan State from 1983–87, was a finalist to succeed Mason, but he didn't get the position.

Former North Carolina head coach Dick Crum was hired to replace Mason. Despite high hopes for his tenure, Crum's Golden Flashes never put together a winning season in three years, compiling a record of 7–26. Crum was fired following the 1990 season.

Improvements and stability
Former Flashes standout Jim Corrigall began in 1994 and became the first coach since Don James to coach more than three seasons, lasting four. Although some progress was made, the Golden Flashes best season under Corrigall, a 3–8 campaign, proved to be his last in 1997. Three wins in 1997 were the most wins for Kent State since 1988. Corrigall had an overall record of 8–35–1 in four seasons.

Dean Pees was hired in 1998 and suffered through the Flashes' most recent winless season (0–11 in 1998) before leading the team to a slow recovery. In 2001 Kent State posted their first winning season since 1987 when they were led by quarterback Joshua Cribbs to a 6–5 overall record, 5–3 in the MAC. Pees left Kent State after the 2003 season to take the defensive coordinator job with the New England Patriots of the National Football League (NFL) under head coach Bill Belichick.

Coach Doug Martin was promoted from offensive coordinator and began his tenure as head coach in 2004. His best season was the 2006 season, which saw Kent State go 6–6 overall and 5–3 in the MAC, finishing second in the East division. Kent State began the 2010 season with hopes of contending for a MAC title, but early losses at Miami and Toledo ended any hope for a title. The team did record its first-ever sell-out at Dix Stadium on October 9 when a crowd of 24,211 watched the Flashes defeat the arch-rival Akron Zips 28–17 to reclaim the Wagon Wheel.

In the days following a 38–3 loss at Western Michigan, which dropped the team's record to 4–7 and 3–4 in the MAC, Doug Martin announced his resignation, effective at the conclusion of the season. The team responded with a 28–6 upset win over the first-place Ohio Bobcats at Dix Stadium to finish with a record of 5–7 overall and 4–4 in the MAC. Martin finished his tenure with a record of 29–53 overall and 21–35 in the MAC.

Darrell Hazell era (2010–2012)

Ohio State wide receivers coach Darrell Hazell was hired to replace Martin. Hazell was the first African American head football coach in the history of Kent State football.

In Hazell's first season, 2011, the team had two three-game losing streaks, but also had a five-game winning streak in the latter half of the season. Kent State dropped their first three contests, which included losses at eventual BCS national champion Alabama and Kansas State and a home loss to Louisiana-Lafayette. Hazell's first win at Kent State came on September 24, in a 33–25 win over South Alabama at Dix Stadium. The team then dropped their first three MAC games before defeating Bowling Green, which was the start of a five-game winning streak that included a 35–3 win over arch-rival Akron at InfoCision Stadium – Summa Field, Kent State's first win in Akron since 2003. The season ended with a 34–16 loss at Temple. The Flashes finished third in the MAC East with a 5–7 record overall and 4–4 in the MAC.

The 2012 season began with a 41–21 win over Towson at Dix Stadium, followed by a 47–14 loss at Kentucky. Following the loss, the Flashes defeated Buffalo at University at Buffalo Stadium and followed that with a come-from-behind 45–43 win over Ball State in Kent. A 31–17 win over Army at Michie Stadium was the first victory for Kent State over a non-conference team on the road since 2007. The winning streak reached six, the longest for Kent State since 1940, after a 35–23 win over undefeated and 18th-ranked Rutgers at High Point Solutions Stadium. The win was the Flashes' first over a ranked opponent after entering the game 0–22 against ranked teams. The win earned Kent State votes in the October 28, 2012 AP Poll, Coaches' Poll, and the Harris Interactive College Football Poll. The team continued winning, beating Akron in the Battle for the Wagon Wheel game at Dix Stadium, followed by a 48–32 win over the Miami RedHawks at Yager Stadium. The win over Miami set a new team record for consecutive victories in a season at eight and tied the 1973 team for most wins in a season at nine. On November 11, the Flashes were ranked 25th in the weekly AP poll, their first time being ranked since November 5, 1973, when they were ranked 19th for one week.

Kent State clinched their first-ever MAC East Division title and spot in the 2012 MAC Championship Game with a 31–24 win over Bowling Green at Doyt Perry Stadium on November 17. Following the win over Bowling Green, the Flashes rose to No. 23 in the AP poll and entered the Coaches' and Harris polls at No. 25. Kent State was also ranked for the first time in the Bowl Championship Series standings at No. 23. The team climbed as high as 17th in the BCS standings following their regular season-ending win over Ohio at Dix Stadium on November 23, which clinched their first-ever undefeated season in MAC play and set a record for most wins in a season with 11. They were also mentioned as a potential BCS Buster. Kent State, however, fell in overtime to Northern Illinois in the MAC Championship Game. Following the loss to NIU, Kent State accepted the invitation to play in the 2013 GoDaddy.com Bowl. Kent State fell to Arkansas State in the game by a score of 17–13 to finish 11–3 overall.

Darrell Hazell accepted the head coaching position at Purdue on December 5, but Purdue granted Hazell permission to coach Kent State in the bowl game, the first bowl appearance by the Flashes since the 1972 Tangerine Bowl.

2013–present
Paul Haynes, a Kent State alum who had previously served as defensive coordinator at Arkansas, was hired as Kent State's head football coach on December 18, 2012. Haynes was the second African American head coach in the history of Kent State football.

In Haynes' first season, the Golden Flashes finished with a 4–8 record. Kent State followed that season with a 2–9 mark in 2014 and consecutive 3–9 seasons in 2015 and 2016. Haynes was fired after the 2017 season, finishing his tenure with a record of 14–45 overall, 9–30 in conference play.

Sean Lewis became head coach for the 2018 season. The Golden Flashes finished the 2019 season with a record of 7-6, and at the end of the season, the Golden Flashes won their first ever Bowl game, a 51–41 victory over Utah State in the Tropical Smoothie Cafe Frisco Bowl.

Conference affiliations
 Independent (1920–1931)
 Ohio Athletic Conference (1932–1950)
 Mid-American Conference (1951–present)

Championships

Conference championships
Kent State has won one conference championship in school history.

Division championships
Kent State has won two division titles. First doing so in 2012, and again in 2021.

Head coaches
List of Kent State head coaches.
 Paul G. Chandler (1920–1922)
 Frank Harsh (1923–1924)
 Merle E. Wagoner (1925–1932)
 Joe Begala (1933–1934)
 Donald Starn (1935–1942)
 No team (1943–1945)
 Trevor J. Rees (1946–1963)
 Leo Strang (1964–1967)
 Dave Puddington (1968–1970)
 Don James (1971–1974)
 Dennis Fitzgerald (1975–1977)
 Ron Blackledge (1978–1980)
 Ed Chlebek (1981–1982)
 Dick Scesniak (1983–1985)
 Glen Mason (1986–1987)
 Dick Crum (1988–1990)
 Pete Cordelli (1991–1993)
 Jim Corrigall (1994–1997)
 Dean Pees (1998–2003)
 Doug Martin (2004–2010)
 Darrell Hazell (2011–2012)
 Paul Haynes (2013–2017)
 Sean Lewis (2018–2022)
 Kenni Burns (2023–present)

Bowl games
Kent State has appeared in five bowl games, going 1–4. They won their first bowl game in school history by defeating Utah State in the 2019 Frisco Bowl.

Rivalries

Akron

The two schools first met in 1923 and have played 56 times through the 2013 meeting. Akron went 11–0–1 in the first 12 meetings in the series between 1923 and 1941, with no games played from 1924–27 and 1937–39. Kent State started a 10-game winning streak in 1942 through 1954, though no games were played during the World War II years of 1943–45 when neither school fielded teams. After the 1954 meeting, the rivalry was scrapped due to a lack of competition. It was reinstated in 1972 and has been an annual contest since 1983. In 1992, Akron joined the MAC and the rivalry became a conference game.

Since 1946, the two teams have played for the Wagon Wheel. The story goes that John R. Buchtel was searching for a site to start a new college in 1870 near what is now Kent State University when his wagon became stuck in the mud. The horses pulled the wagon apart and one of the wheels ended up being buried. Buchtel would eventually settle on a site in Akron for Buchtel College. In 1902, while digging for a pipeline in Kent, the wheel was discovered and eventually came into the possession of Kent State dean of men Dr. Raymond Manchester. It was he who suggested in 1945 that the wheel be used as a trophy for the winner of the Kent State-Akron football game.

Akron leads the series 35–24–2 through the 2018 season

Bowling Green

Bowling Green leads the series 60–22–6 through the 2020 season.

Facilities

The Flashes' home field is Dix Stadium, located along Summit Street on the eastern edge of the KSU campus just east of Ohio State Route 261. The stadium opened in 1969 and has a seating capacity of 25,318. Dix Stadium features a FieldTurf playing surface, which was installed in 2005. It was originally a natural grass field until 1997, when an Astroturf surface was installed. From 1997 to 2004, the stadium also hosted the Kent State field hockey team until a new facility for field hockey was built immediately north of the stadium in 2005.

Dix Stadium was most recently renovated in two phases in 2007 and 2008. Phase one included construction of a large canopy over the press box, new entrance gates, and a ticket office, all completed prior to the 2007 season opener. Phase two included the demolition of the south end zone seats and construction of a new high definition scoreboard, concession area, and plaza in the sound end zone area.

Adjacent to the stadium to the north are two natural grass practice fields. Immediately east of the stadium is the Kent State Field House, which opened in 1990. The Field House includes a full-size football field, a six-lane indoor track, and a weight training room named for Kent State football alumnus James Harrison. The building, one of the first indoor football facilities built in Ohio, is also used by several other Kent State athletic teams during the year and is the home indoor venue for the men's and women's track teams. It includes locker rooms for women's soccer, field hockey, softball, and men's and women's track.

Dix Stadium is the third facility the Flashes have called home. From the team's inception in 1920 through the 1940 season, they played at Rockwell Field, which was located adjacent to the original campus buildings on what is now known as The Commons. Rockwell Field was shared with the track and baseball teams and was plagued with drainage and quality issues its entire existence as an athletic field. For seating, it initially had no seating before primitive wooden bleachers were added in the 1930s. At its peak, the bleachers held approximately 3,000 people, with crowds reported for some games as large as 5,000. In 1941, the team moved to the new Athletic Field along Summit Street, a Works Progress Administration project that included separate football and baseball fields, with the football field surrounded by a cinder track. Seating was again provided on primitive wooden bleachers. After the football team was restored in 1946 following the return of men from World War II, a drive started in the late 1940s to build a permanent grandstand around the existing field. Memorial Stadium opened in 1950 with seating for 7,000 fans, a new electronic scoreboard, permanent press box, and field lighting. It was expanded multiple times and by 1966 seated approximately 20,000 people. Most of Memorial Stadium was used in the construction of Dix Stadium as the Memorial Stadium seating areas were dismantled in 1969 and transported to the current site in a new configuration.

Notable players

Despite the overall lack of success in the program, Kent State has produced a number of standouts including several prominent figures in college football, the Canadian Football League and in the National Football League.

College football
Lou Holtz, former head coach of the Notre Dame Fighting Irish, North Carolina State Wolfpack, and South Carolina Gamecocks
Gary Pinkel, former head coach of the Missouri Tigers and Toledo Rockets
Nick Saban, head coach of the Alabama Crimson Tide; former head coach of the LSU Tigers, Michigan State Spartans and Toledo Rockets (college), and Miami Dolphins (NFL)

Canadian Football League
Walter Bender, former CFL player
Jim Corrigall, former Toronto Argonauts player and member of Canadian Football Hall of Fame
Jim Goss, former Ottawa Rough Riders player 
Gerry Tuttle, former BC Lions player
Jay McNeil, former Calgary Stampeders player

National Football League
40 Kent State alumni have either played in or are playing in the National Football League—although as noted below, not all of them played football at the school.

Former Golden Flashes football players
Art Best, Chicago Bears, New York Giants
Joshua Cribbs, Cleveland Browns, Oakland Raiders, Indianapolis Colts
Julian Edelman, New England Patriots
Abram Elam, Dallas Cowboys
Josh Kline, New England Patriots
James Harrison, Pittsburgh Steelers, Baltimore Ravens, New England Patriots, Cincinnati Bengals
Daniel Muir, Indianapolis Colts
Rico Murray, Cincinnati Bengals
Jack Williams, Denver Broncos
Usama Young, New Orleans Saints, Cleveland Browns, Oakland Raiders
Jameson Konz, Seattle Seahawks, Dallas Cowboys, Denver Broncos
Monte Simmons, Philadelphia Eagles
Ishmaa'ily Kitchen. Cleveland Browns
Brian Winters, New York Jets
Dri Archer, Pittsburgh Steelers, New York Jets, Buffalo Bills
Jack Lambert, former Pittsburgh Steelers player and member of Pro Football Hall of Fame
Don Nottingham, former player for Miami Dolphins and Baltimore Colts
O.J. Santiago, former tight end for the Atlanta Falcons, Cleveland Browns, Oakland Raiders and New England Patriots
Abdul Salaam, defensive end for the New York Jets and member of the New York Sack Exchange
Andy Harmon, Defensive tackle for the Philadelphia Eagles
Pete Mikolajewski, former San Diego Chargers player
Eric Wilkerson, Pittsburgh Steelers
Van Jakes, Cornerback Kansas City Chiefs New Orleans SaintsGreen Bay Packers

Other Kent State products in the NFL
Antonio Gates, Los Angeles Chargers — played basketball at KSU
Jermail Porter, Kansas City Chiefs — an All-American wrestler at KSU

Retired numbers

Future non-conference opponents
Announced schedules as of January 24, 2022.

References

External links

 

 
American football teams established in 1920
1920 establishments in Ohio